Kenmar is a census-designated place (CDP) in Loyalsock Township, Lycoming County, Pennsylvania, United States. As of the 2010 census, it had a population of 4,124. Kenmar is not a separately incorporated community, but is a part of Loyalsock Township (which is a municipality under Pennsylvania law).

Kenmar is bordered by Four Mile Drive to the north, Miller Run and the CDP of Faxon to the west, Interstate 180 to the south, and Loyalsock Creek and the borough of Montoursville to the east.

Kenmar is east of Faxon; there was a previous CDP named "East Faxon" in Lycoming County, but it lost its status as a CDP in the 1990 Census.

Demographics

References

Census-designated places in Lycoming County, Pennsylvania
Census-designated places in Pennsylvania